Malachy John Goltok (12 July 1965 in Bauchi – 21 March 2015 in Jos) was the Bishop of the Roman Catholic Diocese of Bauchi, Nigeria.

He was ordained a priest by Bishop of Jos, Gabriel Gonsum Ganaka on 4 November 1990 and appointed as second Bishop of Bauchi on 18 March 2011 by Pope Benedict XVI.

He died 21 March 2015 after a short serious illness.

References

1965 births
2015 deaths
21st-century Roman Catholic bishops in Nigeria
Roman Catholic bishops of Bauchi